Stanley Road is the third solo album by Paul Weller, released by Go! Discs in 1995. In 1998 Q magazine readers voted it the 46th greatest album of all time.  The album took its name from the street in Woking where Weller grew up. Weller's cover version of the song "I Walk on Guilded Splinters" was featured in the season ending montage of The Wire'''s fourth season finale, Final Grades.

On 30 May 2005, a three-disc 10th anniversary deluxe edition of the album was released by Island Records. The expanded edition included demos, live and BBC session recordings and a DVD documentary directed by Simon Halfon which featured interviews, behind-the-scenes footage and music videos.

Artwork
The album's cover collage was created by the artist Peter Blake, designer of The Beatles' Sgt Pepper's album artwork (album package design for Weller was supervised by his long-term associate Simon Halfon).

Collaborations
The album features contributions from several notable collaborators, including Noel Gallagher (then of Oasis), who appears playing acoustic guitar on "I Walk on Gilded Splinters", and Steve Winwood (formerly of The Spencer Davis Group and Traffic), who performs on the songs "Woodcutter's Son" and "Pink on White Walls". Weller is also joined by long-time collaborators Steve Cradock (co-founder of Ocean Colour Scene) and Steve White (The Style Council).

The album was co-produced by Brendan Lynch, who had also worked on Weller's previous two solo albums, Paul Weller and Wild Wood.

Reception

Ted Kessler, in his contemporary, May 1995 review for NME, felt that the album was "doggedly retro and straight ahead" – an "old fart rockin' blues record" in the style of Eric Clapton, though with "just enough edge to keep you tuned".

Evelyn McDonnell, in a July 1995 review for Rolling Stone, noted the collaborations with musicians such as Steve Winwood and Noel Gallagher, commenting that "Weller's work supplies the connecting link between several generations of British rock and soul", and that Weller's session band were able to lay down "some admirably funky grooves". However, she felt that "Weller takes his musical bombast to Springsteenian levels at points. And his attempt to return to populist roots sinks well below Springsteenian levels of banality".

Legacy
In a retrospective summary for Record Collector in 2008, John Reed commented that "Stanley Road'' remained the apex of Weller's career in terms of commercial success".

Track listing
All songs written by Paul Weller, except where noted.

Vinyl version
All songs written by Paul Weller, except where noted.

Personnel
Paul Weller – vocals (1–12), guitar (1–7, 9–11), piano (1, 2, 4, 6, 7, 11, 12), shakers (1), organ (3, 5), percussion (3, 5), Novatron (4), Hammond organ (8, 10), Wurlitzer (8, 9)
Yolanda Charles – bass (4, 7, 9)
Steve Winwood – piano (5, 10), Hammond organ (5), Wurlitzer (5)
Mick Talbot – Fender Rhodes (8), pipe organ (12), Hammond organ (12)
Carleen Anderson – backing vocals (1, 5, 8), extra vocals (9), vocals (12)
Steve Cradock – guitar (1, 2, 6), backing vocals (1, 11), acoustic guitar (11), electric guitar (11)
Helen Turner – Hammond organ (4, 6), Novatron Strings (6, 7, 9, 11), organ (9)
Brendan Lynch – Cyremin (1, 11), Mini-Moog (7), tambourine (8), accordion (8), finger cymbals (10)
Dr. Robert – bass (1, 2, 6, 11), backing vocals (1, 2)
Joy Hawley – cello (12)
Constantine Wier – voodoo vocal (3)
David Liddle – acoustic slide guitar (5)
Mark Nelson – bass (3, 5, 8, 10)
Steve White – drums (1–11), percussion (3, 5)
Noel Gallagher – acoustic guitar (3)

Charts

References

1995 albums
Paul Weller albums
Go! Discs albums
Albums with cover art by Peter Blake (artist)